Prince William Frederick Henry of the Netherlands (Dutch: Willem Frederik Hendrik; 13 June 1820 – 13 January 1879) was the third son of King William II of the Netherlands and his wife, Grand Duchess Anna Pavlovna of Russia. He was born at Soestdijk Palace.

Prince Henry became Governor of Luxembourg in 1850, in which capacity he served until his death in 1879.  During his tenure, he worked with the government to launch the reactionary Coup of 1856, which consolidated power in the monarchy and the executive.  However, most of the changes were reversed by the new constitution issued in 1868 after the 1867 Luxembourg Crisis, during which the crown tried to sell the grand duchy to France.

Career

Prince Henry was appointed an officer in the navy in his teens, and served many years, whence the sobriquet de Zeevaarder ("the Navigator"), after the Portuguese Prince Henry the Navigator.  He visited the Dutch East Indies in 1837, remaining there for seven months.

Personal life
He married twice. On 9 May 1853, in Weimar, he married Amalia Maria da Gloria Augusta of Saxe-Weimar-Eisenach (Ghent, 20 May 1830 - Walferdange Castle, 1 May 1872). On 24 August 1878, in Potsdam, he married Marie Elisabeth Louise Frederica of Prussia (Marmorpalais, 14 September 1855 – Schloss Albrechtsberg, 20 June 1888). Both marriages were childless. At the time of his death at Walferdange Castle from measles, he was third in line of succession to the Dutch throne.

Throughout his life, his title was His Royal Highness Prince Henry of the Netherlands, Prince of Orange-Nassau.

Legacy 

The Prins Hendrikkade, a major street in Amsterdam, was named after Prince Henry following his death in 1879. A bust of Henry stands on the street.

The Prins Hendrik Stichting, a charity founded by Prince Henry in 1871 and named after him, provides care to sailors and their widows.

In Luxembourg, an oak tree in Grünewald forest was planted and named after him following his death in 1879. The city of Luxembourg also has a street named after Henry, the Boulevard Prince-Henri.

Honours
He received the following orders and decorations:
 : Grand Cross of the Order of the Netherlands Lion
 : Grand Cross of the Order of the Oak Crown
 : Knight of the Order of St. Andrew the First-called, 10 June 1834
  Kingdom of Prussia: Knight of the Order of the Black Eagle, 8 February 1842
 : Grand Cross of the Order of the White Falcon, 4 February 1845
 : Grand Cross of the Order of the Württemberg Crown, 1849
   Sweden-Norway: Knight of the Order of the Seraphim, 23 February 1850
    Ernestine duchies: Grand Cross of the Saxe-Ernestine House Order, June 1853
 : Grand Cross of the Order of Adolphe of Nassau, with Swords, June 1858
  Electorate of Hesse: Knight of the House Order of the Golden Lion, 12 September 1859
 : Grand Cross of the House and Merit Order of Duke Peter Friedrich Ludwig, with Golden Crown, 24 February 1878
 : Grand Cordon of the Order of Leopold (military), 25 March 1878

Ancestry

Footnotes

External links

1820 births
1879 deaths
Dutch members of the Dutch Reformed Church
Princes of Orange-Nassau
House of Orange-Nassau
Orangism in Luxembourg
Burials in the Royal Crypt at Nieuwe Kerk, Delft
Recipients of the Order of the Netherlands Lion
Sons of kings